Cobos de Cerrato is a municipality located in the province of Palencia, Castile and León, Spain. According to the 2008 census (INE), the municipality has a population of 189 inhabitants.

References

Municipalities in the Province of Palencia